Olga Lidia Vigil Gómez (born August 26, 1970 in Havana) is a retired female basketball player from Cuba. She twice competed for her native country at the Summer Olympics, finishing in fourth (1992) and in sixth place (1996) with the Women's National Team.

References
sports-reference

1970 births
Living people
Cuban women's basketball players
Basketball players at the 1992 Summer Olympics
Basketball players at the 1996 Summer Olympics
Olympic basketball players of Cuba
Basketball players from Havana